The Original Farmers Market is an area of food stalls, sit-down eateries, prepared food vendors, and produce markets in Los Angeles, California, at the corner of Fairfax Avenue and 3rd Street. First opened in July 1934, it is also a historic Los Angeles landmark and tourist attraction.

The Original Farmers Market features more than 100 vendors, including ready-to-eat foods, grocers, and tourist shops, and is located just south of Television City.  Unlike most farmers' markets, which are held only at intervals, The Original Farmers' Market of Los Angeles is a permanent installation and is open seven days a week.  The vendors serve many kinds of food, both American cuisine from local farmers and local ethnic foods from the many immigrant communities of Los Angeles, with many Latin American and Asian cuisines well represented.

It is located at the corner of 3rd Street and Fairfax Avenue in the Fairfax District of Los Angeles. It is adjacent to The Grove outdoor shopping mall; an electric-powered streetcar runs between the two sites.

The market is a destination for foodies in search of the market's ethnic cuisines, specialty food markets, and prepared-food stalls. A sign that reads "Meet Me at Third and Fairfax" displays at the front of The Original Farmers Market.

History 

The origins of the market started in 1880, when Arthur Fremont Gilmore and his partner, who had come from Illinois, bought two dairy farms in the Los Angeles area. Gilmore bought what is now called The Original Farmers Market, and his partner bought the land plot nowadays known as The Grove. Ten years later the partners decided to split their holdings and Gilmore took control of the large 256-acre ranch, its dairy herd, and farmhands at what is now the world-famous Original Farmers Market and Grove. The market started when a dozen nearby farmers began to park their trucks on a field to sell fresh produce to local residents. The cost to rent the space was fifty cents per day.

Gilmore Oil Company replaced the dairy farm when oil was discovered under the land while drilling for water wells in 1905; this became the Salt Lake Oil Field. Earl Bell (E. B.) Gilmore, son of A. F. Gilmore, took over the family business. The younger Gilmore started midget car racing and brought professional football to Los Angeles. He built Gilmore Field for the Hollywood Stars baseball team, which was owned by Bing Crosby, Barbara Stanwyck, and Cecil B. DeMille.

When Television City opened next door in 1952, The Original Farmers Market provided those working or visiting that television studio a convenient place to shop or eat.

In the 1970s The Country Kitchen, a restaurant owned and operated by Jack and Eileen Smith (located next to the still-operating Du-par's), was popular with stars and their fans alike. Mickey Rooney could sometimes be found working behind the counter.

In 2014 The Farmers Market opened Farmers Market in LAX Terminal 5 in collaboration with Delaware North Companies. The location at the airport marks the first time in the history of the iconic Original Farmers Market that the Los Angeles landmark has expanded beyond Third & Fairfax. The licensed location features a broad selection of meals, snacks, wine, coffee and sweets from Original Farmers Market restaurants and stalls, so that visitors from across the world can experience a taste of the legendary Farmers Market inside Terminal 5.

In popular culture
The 1971 Beach Boys song "H.E.L.P. Is On the Way" indirectly refers to The Original Farmers Market in its lyrics:

"We ate tonight at Fairfax and 3rd (Fairfax and 3rd)We're gonna spread the news and give you the word''."

The song served to promote songwriter Brian Wilson's own health food store, Radiant Radish.

See also
The Grove at Farmers Market
CBS Television City
Hollywood Stars

References

External links

National Farmers Market Association

Commercial buildings in Los Angeles
Los Angeles
Shopping malls on the Westside, Los Angeles
Los Angeles Historic-Cultural Monuments
Fairfax, Los Angeles
1934 establishments in California
Food halls
Market halls
Food retailers